Eduardo Navarro may refer to:

 Eduardo Navarro (footballer) (born 1979), Spanish footballer
 Eduardo Navarro (artist) (born 1979), Argentinian artist
 Eduardo de Almeida Navarro, Brazilian philologist and lexicographer